"Blue Tomorrow" was a single released by the English football team Chelsea in 2000.  It reached number 22 in the UK Singles Chart.

References

2000 singles
Chelsea F.C. songs
Football songs and chants
2000 songs
Song articles with missing songwriters